Montecalvo Versiggia is a comune (municipality) in the Province of Pavia in the Italian region Lombardy, located about  south of Milan and about  southeast of Pavia.

Montecalvo Versiggia borders the following municipalities: Canevino, Golferenzo, Lirio, Montalto Pavese, Rocca de' Giorgi, Santa Maria della Versa and Volpara.

References

External links

 Official website

Cities and towns in Lombardy